In enzymology, an ATP adenylyltransferase is an enzyme that catalyzes the chemical reaction

ADP + ATP  phosphate + P1,P4-bis(5'-adenosyl) tetraphosphate

Thus, the two substrates of this enzyme are ADP and ATP, whereas its two products are phosphate and P1,P4-bis(5'-adenosyl) tetraphosphate.

This enzyme belongs to the family of transferases, specifically those transferring phosphorus-containing nucleotide groups (nucleotidyltransferases).  The systematic name of this enzyme class is ADP:ATP adenylyltransferase. Other names in common use include bis(5'-nucleosyl)-tetraphosphate phosphorylase (NDP-forming), diadenosinetetraphosphate alphabeta-phosphorylase, adenine triphosphate adenylyltransferase, diadenosine 5',5'"-P1,P4-tetraphosphate alphabeta-phosphorylase, (ADP-forming), and dinucleoside oligophosphate alphabeta-phosphorylase.  This enzyme participates in purine metabolism.

References

 

EC 2.7.7
Enzymes of unknown structure